Downtown Louisville is the largest central business district in the Commonwealth of Kentucky and the urban hub of the Louisville, Kentucky Metropolitan Area. Its boundaries are the Ohio River to the north, Hancock Street to the east, York and Jacob Streets to the south, and 9th Street to the west. As of 2015, the population of Downtown Louisville was 4,700, although this does not include directly surrounding areas such as Old Louisville, Butchertown, NuLu, and Phoenix Hill.

The five main areas of the Central Business District consist of:
West Main District (west of 2nd St., north of Market St., east of 9th St., and south of the Ohio River)
East Main District (east of 2nd St., north of Market St., west of Hancock St., and south of the Ohio River; contains the Whiskey Row Historic District)
Medical Center (east of 2nd St., south of Market St., west of Hancock St., and north of Jacob St.)
Fourth St. District (south of Market St., west of 2nd St., north of York St., and east of 5th St.)
Civic Center (south of Market St., west of 5th St., north of York St., and east of 9th St.)
The tallest buildings in Kentucky are located in Downtown Louisville and include 400 West Market designed by John Burgee, PNC Tower designed by Harrison & Abramovitz, PNC Plaza designed by Welton Becket, and the Humana Building designed by Michael Graves. In addition, it is the center of local and regional government.

A glassed-in skywalk called the Louie Link stretches six city blocks and links together the Kentucky International Convention Center (KICC), Fourth Street Live!, three hotels (Galt House Hotel & Suites, Marriott and Hyatt Regency), and 2,300 hotel rooms. In 2010 it was extended from the Galt House to the new $16 million Skywalk Garage, an eight-level, 860-space parking facility on Third Street, and a second skywalk connects from the garage across Third Street to the new KFC Yum! Center.

History

Downtown Louisville is the oldest part of the city of Louisville, whose initial development was closely tied to the Ohio River. The largest early fort, Fort Nelson, was built in 1781 near what is today the corner of 7th and Main streets. Many early residents lived nearby after moving out of the forts by the mid-1780s, although little remains of the earliest (mostly wood) structures.

Early plans of the city, such as William Pope's original plan in 1783, show a simple grid on an east/west axis along the river. The earliest streets, Main, Market and Jefferson retain their original names from the plan, while the smaller Green Street is now known as Liberty (it was renamed after Green Street acquired a seedy reputation due to its many burlesque theaters). Main Street was the city's initial commercial hub for nearly a century.

By 1830 Louisville passed Lexington as Kentucky's largest city, with a population over 10,000. The steamboat era saw the opening of the Louisville and Portland Canal just west of downtown, and local commerce picked up further with the founding of banks and manufacturing. Most of Louisville's population was packed into downtown, which by this time stretched as far south as Prather Street (later renamed Broadway). Many still-remaining buildings reveal what the area was like at this time, with narrow, two to four-story buildings packing the streets.

The area and the city continued to grow during the railroad era. However, the increased mobility of early trolleys, as well as the sheer number and diversity of people moving to Louisville, saw a shift in focus as areas like Phoenix Hill, Russell and what is now Old Louisville began to be built on the edges of downtown, particularly after the city annexed those areas in 1868. Railroads lead to a diminished role for the river in transportation, further reducing the importance of downtown in favor of areas on what was then the edge of the city, along rail lines.

In 1886, the first skyscraper, the Kenyon Building, was completed on Fifth Street, followed in 1890 by the ten-story Columbia Building. The development of three large suburban parks and the electrified streetcar lead to the first true movement to the suburbs at this time. Some of downtown's business and industry followed people toward these areas. But by the 1920s the commercial center of Louisville was still nearby, at 4th and Broadway, dubbed the "magic corner" by the Herald-Post. The riverfront area of downtown was still being actively improved, such as with the building of what is now George Rogers Clark Memorial Bridge across the Ohio at Second Street in 1929.

After World War II, suburbanization increased and downtown began to decline as interstate highways further reduced the importance of its central location. Since the 1970s, downtown has been the subject of both urban renewal and historic preservation efforts. While many new buildings have been built, it has sometimes been at the expense of older landmarks, such as the Tyler Block.

Many buildings sat totally or mostly vacant at this time, and some became dilapidated to the point where they burned down or had to be razed. Many riverfront industrial sites were abandoned or saw limited use, many were eventually redeveloped into Louisville Waterfront Park. Other issues in the 1970s through the early 1990s included a former theater district on Jefferson Street that had become dubbed the "porno district". The businesses there were seen by the city as an eyesore since they were so close to the convention center, and most were demolished or burned down by the late 1990s. A few adult book stores and bars remained in the general area as of 2007.

Unlike the city's previous tallest buildings, which were all set along the Broadway corridor, these new buildings were set closer to the riverfront along Main and Market Streets.

Since 2000, downtown has seen another major growth spurt, although this one not only includes new high rises, but also a large scale return of large scale residential and retail back to the city center. The completion of Louisville Slugger Field along with a mass expansion of the city's
Waterfront Park, both completed in 1998, sparked new development along the eastern edge of downtown, with entire abandoned blocks rebuilt with new condominium units and shops. Also, new to Louisville is the 22,000-seat KFC Yum! Center at Second and Main Streets which was completed in 2010.

Residential

Early residences outside of the forts, still mostly wood structures, were built along the modern street grid on early lots sold to settlers, but have all been demolished over time. What became the almost entirely office and parking-lot dominated downtown still had many solidly single family residential blocks on its fringes up until the early 20th century. Streets near Broadway, such as Chestnut, were lined with large mansions of the owners of businesses on Main and Market streets.

Though these houses were built of brick and other longer-lasting materials, none remained single family homes by the 21st century, although some had been converted for other uses, such as office space. The Brennan House at 631 S. Fifth, which is operated as a historic property with daily tours, shows a glimpse of Downtown Louisville's residential past. A structure at 432 South Fifth Street is the only example of a pre-Civil War residence remaining Downtown; built in 1829 it has been converted to commercial use.

By the late 20th century, downtown Louisville had acquired a reputation as a place to work and visit during the week but which shuts down evenings and weekends. The first changes to this were the conversion of old warehouse and factory space to loft apartments in the late 1980s. By the late 1990s and early 2000s, new developments of luxury condominiums such as the 22-story Waterfront Park Place, and the $30 million project Fleur de Lis on Main, indicate increasing residential interest in Downtown Louisville. On September 9, 2013, Mayor Greg Fischer joined groundbreaking ceremonies for the second phase of RiverPark Place, a marina apartment/condominium development covering 40 acres along River Road, with a walkway west to Waterfront Park. In 1997, the Kentucky Towers was the largest residential building in Downtown Louisville, and in 2015, just south of downtown, The 800 Apartments started undergoing a more than $10 million modernization. In 2007 Downtown Louisville became Jefferson County's tenth Multiple Listing Service zone.

Housing units available downtown were expected to double between 2005 and 2010, from 1,800 to nearly 4,000, after increasing by only 900 units from 1985 to 2005. This is both a result of new condominium construction and efforts to convert existing buildings into mixed usage, such as the $20 million redevelopment of the historic eight-story Henry Clay building at Third and Chestnut streets into a mix of residential, restaurant, retail and event space. The redevelopment also includes property that extends east to Fourth Street, which will become a public piazza, and the historic Wright-Taylor building, a two-story,  structure that faces Fourth Street and is located behind the Henry Clay, and is now an upscale restaurant that occupies the entire Wright-Taylor building.

Plans
Projects in the works include the construction of a wharf along the Riverwalk Trail, and the Ohio River Bridges Project, involving the reconstruction of Spaghetti Junction (the intersection of I-65, I-64 and I-71) along with the addition of a new bridge for northbound I-65 traffic. One recently completed project was the conversion of the former Big Four railroad bridge into a pedestrian and bicycle only bridge, which opened on the Kentucky side in 2013 and the Indiana side in 2014.

On August 19, 2007, city leaders and the Cordish Company, developers of 4th Street Live!, announced Center City, a $442 million, multi-year plan to develop , bounded by Second, Third and Liberty streets and Muhammad Ali Boulevard, that will include new housing, restaurants, a cinema and a boutique hotel. An estimated  of floor space being created, including a 15-story structure. As the plan would require $130 million in local and state tax rebates for Cordish, it requires approval from the Louisville Metro Council and Kentucky General Assembly. There is no official start time for the project, as financing is still being secured by the Cordish Company.

Also announced in 2007, the glass and steel $50 million shopping and office complex Iron Quarter was to be constructed within the Whiskey Row Historic District, but the project was delayed and eventually set aside when property owner Todd Blue made an agreement with the city of Louisville in January 2011 to demolish the seven original buildings. In May 2011, after all seven buildings had been landmarked, a new agreement was made with the city to save five of the seven buildings by donating one and selling the other four, with the remaining two to be demolished. Facades of all seven buildings are to be preserved.

Attractions

Many attractions are located in Downtown Louisville.
 "Museum Row" in the West Main District
 Frazier History Museum
 Kentucky Museum of Art and Craft
 Kentucky Science Center
 Louisville Slugger Museum & Factory
 Muhammad Ali Center
 National Society of the Sons of the American Revolution Genealogical Research Library
 East Market District, featuring a row of art galleries, prominently featured in the monthly First Friday Trolley Hop
 Belle of Louisville
 Early Times Distillery
 Fort Nelson Park
 Fourth Street Live!
 The Kentucky Center
 Louisville Extreme Park
 Louisville Slugger Field (home of the Louisville Bats and Louisville City FC, though Louisville City will move out of the stadium once it opens its own new stadium in Butchertown in 2020)
 Waterfront Park
 Riverfront Plaza/Belvedere
 KFC Yum! Center (home of Louisville Cardinals men's and women's basketball, as well as a secondary venue for women's volleyball)

Images

Modern high rises

Tallest buildings in Downtown Louisville

See also
 Cityscape of Louisville, Kentucky
 Geography of Louisville, Kentucky
 Ohio River Bridges Project
 National Register of Historic Places listings in Downtown Louisville, Kentucky

References

Further reading

External links
 Louisville Downtown Partnership
 Downtown Maps
 Street Map of Downtown Louisville
 
 Emporis - Tallest buildings in Louisville
    Images of Central Business District / Downtown (Louisville, Ky.) in the University of Louisville Libraries Digital Collections

Neighborhoods in Louisville, Kentucky
Economy of Louisville, Kentucky
Louisville